Singularity is the sixth solo album by Robby Krieger, former guitarist for The Doors. The album was released in 2010. 
Singularity was nominated in the 53rd Grammy Awards for best Pop Instrumental Album.

Track listing 
All tracks composed by Robby Krieger and Arthur Barrow; except where indicated
"Russian Caravan (Intro)" (Krieger)
"Russian Caravan"
"Southern Cross"
"Event Horizon (Intro)" (Krieger)
 "Event Horizon"
"Coffin Dodger"
"Trane Running Late"
"Let It Slide"
"Solar Wind" (Krieger, Dale Alexander)
"House of Bees"

References 

2010 albums
Robby Krieger albums